Pueblo Grande Ruin and Irrigation Sites are pre-Columbian archaeological sites and ruins, located in Phoenix, Arizona. They include a prehistoric platform mound and irrigation canals. The City of Phoenix manages these resources as the Pueblo Grande Museum Archaeological Park.

History
Long before Euroamericans moved into the area that is now Phoenix, it was home to a thriving civilization called Huhugam by the culturally affiliated O’odham and the Hohokam by archaeologists. These Ancestral Native Americans created the archaeological structures preserved at Pueblo Grande.

Pueblo Grande features a large platform mound with retaining walls. This massive structure contains over 20,000 cubic meters (yards) of fill. There were also many dwellings, and at least three ball courts.

The Hohokam archaeological culture developed some of the largest and most advanced canal systems in all of pre-Columbian North America. They were the first people to practice irrigated agriculture in the region. The remnants of their irrigation canals are part of the archaeological site at Pueblo Grande.

Pueblo Grande was occupied from approximately AD 450 to 1450, at which time it was abandoned like many other villages throughout the Phoenix basin. The reasons why these ancestral Native Americans left their villages and irrigation systems are widely debated among archaeologists. There are many competing hypotheses that include floods, droughts, warfare, and disease.

Notable Features

Canal System 
Canals were built, maintained, and abandoned by the Hohokam for almost a thousand years.  The site of Pueblo Grande is situated at the headgates of multiple large canals on the north side of the Salt River. A combination of a bend in the river and a bedrock outcropping served to push river water to the surface and made this an ideal place to divert water into the canals where it was carried for long distances. The longest Hohokam canal originated near Pueblo Grande and carried water for over 16 miles into the area of modern-day Glendale. This likely gave Pueblo Grande a prominent role among the many Hohokam villages on the north side of the Salt River.  The remains of these canals are preserved at Pueblo Grande in an area called the Park of Four Waters.

Other platform mound villages like Pueblo Grande were built at strategic locations along the Salt River, and may have been involved in controlling the flow of water to outlying villages. Complex cultural organization would have been needed to maintain all the canal systems.

Ballcourts 
The site of Pueblo Grande may have had as many as 2 ball courts. These were publicly accessible sites likely used for ceremonial purposes, possibly ritual ball games, and periodic markets. Ball games may have drawn large crowds to participate in market activities, facilitating regional trade. There may be cultural links between Hohokam archaeological culture ballcourts and Mesoamerican ballcourts, though, there are significant architectural differences between their design.

Some time after AD 1100, the Hohokam archaeological tradition discontinued use of their ballcourts. Many of the ballcourts were filled in with trash and platform mounds, such as the one at Pueblo Grande became more prominent at Hohokam sites.

Platform Mound 
The platform mound at Pueblo Grande began as two low circular mounds around A.D. 800. These were expanded over time with stone-walled cells that were filled with trash and capped with caliche plaster to create a platform upon which structures were built. The platform mound was also surrounded by a 6 to 7-foot high compound wall, which would have limited access to the mound. Some archaeologists have suggested that platform mounds were used for ceremonial purposes. The platform mound at Pueblo Grande is one of the largest mound structures ever built by the Hohokam.

A possible astronomical observatory was built on top of the Pueblo Grande platform mound. One room had doors that may have, at the winter and summer solstice, aligned with Hole-in-the-rock, a natural feature in the Papago Buttes to the northeast.

Archival records indicate that there was once also a “big house” at Pueblo Grande, similar to the one at Casa Grande National Monument.

Pueblo Grande Museum and Archaeological Park
The platform mound and approximately 5 acres of surrounding land were donated to the City of Phoenix in 1924 by Thomas Armstrong. Soon after, Phoenix purchased an additional 10 acres south of the platform mound, named “Park of Four Waters,”; which became part of the Pueblo Grande Museum and Archaeological Park. In 1929 Odd S. Halseth was hired as both the director of Pueblo Grande and as Phoenix's City Archaeologist – the first City Archaeologist in the United States.

Pueblo Grande Museum and Archaeological Park continued to expand and was declared a National Historic Landmark in 1964. It consists of two parts, that were on adjacent properties, and both associated with the same history.  They were listed separately in the National Register of Historic Places as Pueblo Grande Ruin and Hohokam-Pima Irrigation Sites on the October 15, 1966 date when all National Historic Landmark sites were administratively listed. In addition to containing exhibit galleries, the museum now functions as a repository for archaeological collections from the City of Phoenix.

Gallery

See also

 Hohokam – other sites:
 Casa Grande Ruins National Monument
 Hohokam Pima National Monument
 Mesa Grande
 Snaketown
 Indian Mesa
 List of historic properties in Phoenix, Arizona
 Phoenix Historic Property Register

References

Further reading 
 Andrews, John P. and Todd W. Bostwick. 2000. Desert Farmers at the River’s Edge: The Hohokam and Pueblo Grande. Pueblo Grande Museum, City of Phoenix.
 Fish, Suzanne K. and Paul R. Fish, eds. 2008. The Hohokam Millennium. School for Advanced Research, Santa Fe. New Mexico.
 George J. Gumerman, ed.1991.  Exploring the Hohokam, Prehistoric Desert Peoples of the American Southwest. University of New Mexico Press, Albuquerque.
 Haury, Emil W. 1976. The Hohokam: Desert Farmers and Craftsmen – Excavations at Snaketown, 1964–65. University of Arizona Press.
 Abbott, David ed. Centuries of Decline During the Hohokam Classic Period at Pueblo Grande. University of Arizona Press. Tucson, Arizona. 2003.
 Woodson, Kyle. The Social Organization of Hohokam Irrigation in the Middle Gila River Valley, Arizona. Gila River Indian Community Cultural Resource Management Program. Sacaton, Arizona. 2016.
 Wright, Aaron. Religion on the Rocks: Hohokam Rock Art, Ritual Practice, and Social Transformation. University of Utah Press. Salt Lake City, Utah. 2014.

External links

 Pueblo Grande Museum Archaeological Park, official site,  City of Phoenix
 Pueblo Grande Museum Auxiliary, a non-profit organization that supports the Pueblo Grande Museum and Archeological Park
 Pueblo Grande Ruin & Irrigation Sites NHL
 Pueblo Grande Ruin

Hohokam
Museums in Phoenix, Arizona
Archaeological sites in Arizona
Native American museums in Arizona
Parks in Phoenix, Arizona
Archaeological museums in Arizona
Archaeological parks
Archaeological sites on the National Register of Historic Places in Arizona
National Historic Landmarks in Arizona
Former populated places in Arizona
Ancient Puebloan archaeological sites in Arizona
Ruins in the United States
Former populated places in Maricopa County, Arizona
National Register of Historic Places in Maricopa County, Arizona